Kampong Bebuloh is a village in the south-westernmost part of Brunei-Muara District, Brunei. The population was 762 in 2016. It is one of the villages within Mukim Pengkalan Batu, a mukim in the district.

Facilities 
 Bebuloh Primary School — a government primary school
  — the village mosque

References 

Bebuloh